Adefrsew Yenadu (1873–1950) was an army commander, a member of the nobility of the Ethiopian Empire, and a patriot.

Biography
Adefrsew Yenadu was the son of Ras Yenadu.  He was a young favorite of Emperor Menelik II.  In 1896, during the First Italo-Ethiopian War, Adefrsew Yenadu fought bravely at the Battle of Adwa.

In 1930, Dejazmach Adefrsew Yenadu was appointed head of the Imperial Guard (Kebur Zabangna) by Emperor Haile Selassie I.  On 31 March, during Gugsa Welle's Rebellion, he was at the Battle of Anchem as part of the Imperial Army. His forces were part of the reserves.

In 1935, at the beginning the Second Italo-Ethiopian War, Adefrsew Yenadu was with Emperor Haile Selassie. In March 1936, at the Battle of Maychew he commanded the palace guard and reported directly to the emperor. He remained with Haile Selassie to the end of the conflict and, in May, joined him in exile. Adefrsew Yenadu stayed in Jerusalem in the British Mandate of Palestine.

In 1940, during World War II, Adefrsew Yenadu was in the Sudan at the beginning of the East African Campaign.  He was entrusted with the task of negotiating political arrangements with the Arbegnoch and continued to do so throughout the campaign.  In early 1941, when Haile Selassie crossed into Ethiopia, Adefrsew Yenadu  was with him.

In 1942, having successfully served his Emperor, Adefrsew Yenadu was made Shum of Sidamo Province and elevated to Ras.  In 1948, he was appointed as a crown councillor and a senator.

See also
 Ethiopian aristocratic and court titles

Footnotes and citations 
Footnotes

Citations

References 
 
 

1873 births
1950 deaths
Ethiopian nobility
Ethiopian military personnel